Florence Colle (born 4 December 1965) is a French former track and field athlete, who specialized in the 100 metres hurdles. She placed fifth at the 1988 Seoul Olympics and sixth at the 1991 World Championships. Her personal best in the 100 metres hurdles is 12.73 seconds, set in 1991.

Career
Born in Annecy, Colle is a two-time French national champion, winning the 100 m hurdles in 1987 and the long jump in 1989. Amongst her other successes, she was the inaugural long jump champion at the 1989 Jeux de la Francophonie, won a bronze medal in the 100m hurdles at the 1987 Summer Universiade, and reached the semi-finals of the 100m hurdles at the 1987 World Championships in Athletics.

Following her retirement from the sport she became a physician. As a doctor, she chose the speciality of physical medicine and rehabilitation. She started up the Physical Medicine and Rehabilitation service of the Sainte-Anne Hospital (Paris) after having done her clinic training under Prof. Yelnik of Hôpital Fernand Widal. Colle was interviewed on the news show of France 2, "13 heures", on 29 October 2009, as part of the 7th World Day of Stroke.

International competitions

National titles
French Athletics Championships
100 m hurdles: 1987
Long jump: 1989

References

External links
 

1965 births
Living people
French female hurdlers
French female long jumpers
Olympic athletes of France
Athletes (track and field) at the 1988 Summer Olympics
World Athletics Championships athletes for France
Universiade medalists in athletics (track and field)
French rehabilitation physicians
Sportspeople from Annecy
Universiade bronze medalists for France
Medalists at the 1987 Summer Universiade